Hosa Dinachari (transl. A New Routine) is a 2022 Indian Kannada-language drama genre film directed by Vyshak Pushpalatha and Keerthi Shekhar, starring Babu Hirannaiah, Aruna Balaraj, Mandara Battalahalli.This movie which was initially set to release on 9th December, was pushed to release on 23rd December later by the movie team

Plot
Hosa Dinachari is an absolute 'Feel Good' story, that revolves around three different families work on their dynamics to heal each other, while spending their most vulnerable times with complete strangers

Cast

 Babu Hirannaiah  as Veeranna
 Aruna Balrajas as Gowri
 Deepak Subramanya as Bharath
 Sripriya as Nidhi
 Chethan Vicky as Rajesh
 Mandara Battalahalli as Apeksha
 Varsha Susana Kurien as Kiran

Soundtrack

Hosa Dinachari has four melodious tracks, 'Ninade Nenapu', 'Neene', 'Oh Manave' and 'Neeli Mugila', all composed by Vyshak Verma and released under the music label, Anand Audio. The soundtrack has voices lent by Vasuki Vaibhav, Varun Ramachandra, Rakshana Sridhar, Anjana Balakrishnan and the composer Vyshak Verma himself.

Reception

Reviewing Hosa Dinachari, Harish Basavarajaiah of The Times of India has given a rating of 3.5 out of 5 and calls it "A slice-of-life film" set during the COVID-19 times. Y Maheshwar Reddy from Bangalore Mirror rates this movie a 4 on 5, by calling it a 'Tribute to Corona Warriors'

References

External links